On January 10, 2018, 19-year-old University of Pennsylvania sophomore Blaze Bernstein was found dead in a park in Orange County, California, eight days after having been reported missing. He was visiting his family in Lake Forest, California, when he was killed. He had been stabbed nineteen times. Two days later, Samuel Woodward, one of Bernstein's former high school classmates and a member of neo-Nazi terrorist group Atomwaffen Division, was arrested and charged with murdering Bernstein. As Bernstein was both openly gay and Jewish, authorities declared that Bernstein was a victim of a hate crime. Five deaths had links to the Atomwaffen Division over eight months from 2017 to early 2018.

Blaze Bernstein
Bernstein was born on April 27, 1998, in South Orange County, California, to Gideon Bernstein, an equity partner at Leisure Capital Management, and Jeanne Pepper, a former lawyer who retired from law in 2000 to raise their three children. After completing high school at Orange County School of the Arts, Blaze enrolled as an undergraduate at the University of Pennsylvania.

Legal proceedings
The presiding judge initially charged Woodward with murder and personal use of a deadly weapon. In August 2018, two charges of committing a hate crime were added because of Bernstein's sexual orientation. Woodward, who has been linked to the murder by DNA evidence, pled not guilty. A pretrial hearing was held in January 2019.

Woodward's attorney stated that Woodward has Asperger syndrome and issues regarding his own sexual identity.

Woodward, who was 20 at the time of the crime, faces a sentence of life without parole if found guilty.  He had initially faced a maximum sentence of 26 years in prison the murder and weapons charges, prior to the addition of the hate crime enhancements. Woodward's bail was initially set at $5 million but at hearing in November 2018, the judge decided to deny Woodward bail altogether, remanding him to custody pending trial.

Due to the COVID crisis, Woodward has remained in confinement since his last court appearance in 2018. His trial was tentatively scheduled to begin sometime in 2021, though a series of postponements pushed it back until July 15, 2022.

On July 15, 2022, an Orange County judge temporarily suspended criminal proceedings after Woodward's defense attorney said she had concerns about his competence to stand trial.  In late October 2022, mental health experts deemed Woodward competent, and a pre-trial hearing was scheduled for January 2023.

See also
 List of right-wing terrorist attacks
 Matthew Shepard, murdered in a hate crime in 1998
 Antisemitism in the United States in the 21st century

References

External links
Memorial site for Bernstein

Antisemitic attacks and incidents in the United States
Antisemitism in Pennsylvania
Violence against LGBT people in the United States
Neo-fascist terrorist incidents in the United States
2018 murders in the United States
Attacks in the United States in 2018
Stabbing attacks in 2018
January 2018 crimes in the United States
2018 crimes in California
Lake Forest, California
American victims of anti-LGBT hate crimes
Violence against gay men in the United States
Violence against men in North America
Murdered American Jews
2018 in LGBT history
Deaths by stabbing in California
Antisemitism in California
LGBT history in California
LGBT and Judaism